Tullis Earl "Mickey" McGowan (November 26, 1921 – March 8, 2003) was a professional baseball player.  He was a left-handed pitcher for one season (1948) with the New York Giants.  For his career, he did not record a decision, with a 7.36 earned run average and two strikeouts in  innings pitched.

McGowan was born in Dothan, Alabama and later died in Waycross, Georgia at the age of 81.

External links

1921 births
2003 deaths
New York Giants (NL) players
Major League Baseball pitchers
Baseball players from Alabama
Sportspeople from Dothan, Alabama
Dothan Browns players
Waycross Bears players
Atlanta Crackers players
Greenville Spinners players
Minneapolis Millers (baseball) players
Chattanooga Lookouts players
Jacksonville Tars players